S200 may refer to :

•S-200,used with Indian vikas engine in LVM3 

 S-200 (missile), a Soviet 1960s surface-to-air missile
 S200, solid rocket booster of Indian Geosynchronous Satellite Launch Vehicle Mark III
 Acer neoTouch S200, a smartphone
 Canon PowerShot S200, a camera
 Casio Exilim S200, a camera
 S200, a Nikon Coolpix series digital camera
 Polish railways S200, a diesel locomotive
 Qtek 200, a mobile phone
 Siemens S200, a North American high-floor light rail vehicle 
 SIPA S.200 Minijet, a 1950s French trainer light jet aircraft
 Toyota Crown (S200), a car
 Toyota Crown Majesta (S200), a car
 USATC S200 Class, a 1941 class of steam locomotive

See also